The National Association of University-Model Schools (NAUMS, Inc.) was founded in 2002 to promote University-Model schooling in the United States and to assist existing and developing University-Model Schools.

A University-Model school is a Christian, college-preparatory school which blends aspects of private and homeschooling. Students meet on campus two or three days per week, and complete lessons at home on alternate days under the direction of professional teachers, with parents serving as co-teachers.

The "University Model" name is derived from the university-style scheduling offered by member schools. Students typically register for course on a semester-by-semester basis and may register for a full load or just selected courses.

NAUMS member schools must pursue accreditation as a condition of their membership, and current NAUMS member schools have been accredited by one or more of the following organizations: The Commission on International Trans-Regional Accreditation, the Georgia Accrediting Commission, the Western Association of Schools and Colleges, the Southern Association of Colleges and Schools, Council on Accreditation and School Improvement, and the North Central Association Commission on Accreditation and School Improvement.

As of 2019, there were 88 operating member schools in 19 states, with a total student population of 11,626 students and one international school.

Current University-Model Schools serve students from kindergarten to 12th grade, with some schools offering a more limited range of grades.

Tuition at a university model school is typically 40% to 75% less than a traditional five-days-per-week school, resulting from fewer days on campus and a higher level of parental involvement.

Selected member schools 
Christ Preparatory Academy (Overland Park, KS)

Christian Life Preparatory School (South Fort Worth, Texas)

Covenant Christian Academy (Warrenton, VA)

Cross Classical Academy (Brownwood, TX)

CrossPointe Preparatory (Searcy, AR)

Foundation Preparatory Academy (Richwood, TX)

Legacy Classical Christian Academy, formerly Destiny Christian Academy (Haslet, TX; far Northwest Fort Worth)

Grace Preparatory Academy (Arlington, TX)

Grace Preparatory Academy (Durango, CO)

Grace Preparatory (School Stafford, VA)

Heritage Academy (Sugar Hill, GA)

Heritage Academy (Columbia, MO)

HOPE Academy (Charlotte, N.C.) 

Hope Scholars Academy (Charleston, S.C.)

Legacy Preparatory Christian Academy (The Woodlands, TX)

Logos Preparatory Academy (Sugar Land, TX)

Oak Grove Classical Academy (Albuquerque, NM)

Trinity Classical School (Houston, Texas)

Trinity Christian Academy of Missouri (Wentzville, MO)

Veritas Academy (Austin, TX)

Vineyard Christian Academy (Garden City, ID)

References

External links
 http://umsi.org Official website

Associations of schools
Christian schools in the United States
Educational organizations based in the United States
United States schools associations